Lunarsolar (stylized as LUNARSOLAR) was a four-member South Korean girl group formed by JPlanet Entertainment. The group debuted on September 2, 2020, with their single album Solar: Flare. On May 22, 2022, JPlanet Entertainment announced the disbandment of the group, following the termination of the members' contracts.

History

Pre-debut 
Before joining JPlanet Entertainment, 3 out of 4 members were previously involved in the music industry. Previously, Taeryeong was a contestant on Produce 101 but she was eliminated and ranked at 57th place. She also was a participant in Mix Nine but she was eliminated and placed at 46th place. She was seen performing with girl group A-Daily in October 2018, but she was never announced as an official member of the group. She was also part of ONO Entertainment's pre-debut girl group Blackmamba.

Jian was a former member of girl group S.E.T with the stage name TaeE and participated in The Unit: Idol Rebooting Project but was eliminated and placed at 61st place.

Yuuri was a member of Japanese girl group I'S9 in 2013, until she left (or "graduated") in November 2015. In 2017 she joined a Co-ed Jpop group IsTaR and left in 2018. 

In 2018, JPlanet Entertainment announced Rookie Planet, a project to promote their trainees (or "rookies") to the world before their official debut. They often posted dance covers, vocal covers, and reaction videos. The members were revealed within a 1 year period, starting with Jieun (who later became Jian), Taeryeong, Hyeonjeong (who later became Eseo), Yuuri, and Sujin. Sujin left sometime in early 2020. On March 27th, 2020, Jian appeared on I Can See Your Voice 7, as well as being a cover muse for the YouTube channel MUPLY.

2020–2021: Debut with Solar : Flare,  Solar : Rise and Christmas is You
On July 13, 2020, JPlanet Entertainment announced that they would debut their first girl group and subsequently released the logo image. They released "identity photos" in the order of Jian, Yuuri, Eseo, and Taeryeong starting on July 13, 2020 and ending on July 16, 2020. They released 'Lunar' versions and 'Solar' versions of the identity photos.

The group debuted on September 2, 2020 with their single album Solar : Flare, alongside the music video for their title track "Oh Ya Ya Ya" and had their debut stage on MCountdown on September 3, 2020.

The group released their second single album Solar : Rise, and its title track "Dadada" on April 7, 2021. The group announced on the same day that they were planning to make their debut in the Japanese music industry and signed a contract with label Teichiku Entertainment for future Japanese activities regarding music and management. They are the first artist to sign under the partnership between Teichiku and VICLIP, which was announced on December 24, 2019. The group also opened their official Japanese website ahead of their Japanese debut.

The group released their third single album Christmas is You on December 8, 2021.

2022: Disbandment and Do You Wanna Get Down 
On May 22, 2022, it was revealed that Lunarsolar was to disband, as the members' contracts with JPlanet Entertainment were terminated.

Before their disbandment, the group released a final single titled "Do You Wanna Get Down" on May 23, 2022.

Members 
 Eseo (이서)
 Taeryeong (태령)
 Jian (지안)
 Yuuri (유우리)

Discography

Single albums

Singles

Filmography

Music videos

Awards and nominations

Notes

References

External links 
 
 
South Korean girl groups
2020 establishments in South Korea
Musical groups established in 2020
Musical groups from Seoul
K-pop music groups
2022 disestablishments in South Korea